George Rumpel (19 September 1901 – 15 October 1983) was a Canadian wrestler. He competed in the freestyle light heavyweight event at the 1924 Summer Olympics.

References

1901 births
1983 deaths
Olympic wrestlers of Canada
Sportspeople from Kitchener, Ontario
Wrestlers at the 1924 Summer Olympics
Canadian male sport wrestlers
20th-century Canadian people